Alice Bungisngis and Her Wonder Walis (International title: Giggly Alice / ) is a 2012 Philippine television drama fantasy comedy series broadcast by GMA Network. Directed by Mark Reyes, it stars Bea Binene in the title role. It premiered on February 6, 2012 on the network's Telebabad line up replacing Daldalita. The series concluded on June 8, 2012 with a total of 88 episodes. It was replaced by My Daddy Dearest in its timeslot.

The series is streaming online on YouTube.

Cast and characters

Lead cast
 Bea Binene as Alice Asuncion-Fernandez / Daisy Reyes

Supporting cast
 Jake Vargas as Ace Fernandez
 Derrick Monasterio as Spade Fernandez
 Lexi Fernandez as Queenie Delos Santos
 Jean Garcia as Esmeralda Reyes
 Janno Gibbs as Hilario Asuncion
 Sheena Halili as Sinag
 Buboy Garovillo as Filipe "Ipeng" Lucsin
 Benjie Paras as Timoteo / Tim
 Sef Cadayona as Tomas / Tom
 Irma Adlawan as Margarita "Maggie" Fernandez / Gareng Lucsin
 Alicia Alonzo as Andeng / old Matilda
 Marc Justine Alvarez as Wally
 Isabel Nesreen Frial as Gelay
 Lance Angelo Lucido as Ivan

Guest cast
 Marita Zobel as Alicia
 Roy Alvarez as Zaldy Fernandez
 Ana Roces as Matilda Asuncion
 Ama Quiambao as Anita
 Lovely Rivero as Panying
 Vangie Labalan as Belinda Kasimsiman
 Ellen Adarna as Carla
 Jana Trites as Doray
 Edgar Sandalo as Greg
 Rita Iringan as Wendy
 Nicole Dulalia as Lev
 Sabrina Man as Carol

Ratings
According to AGB Nielsen Philippines' Mega Manila household television ratings, the pilot episode of Alice Bungisngis and Her Wonder Walis earned a 16.3% rating. While the final episode scored a 14.1% rating.

References

External links
 

2012 Philippine television series debuts
2012 Philippine television series endings
Fantaserye and telefantasya
Filipino-language television shows
GMA Network drama series
Television shows set in the Philippines